Cape Cockburn is a cape marking the northeastern extremity of Pasteur Peninsula on Brabant Island, in the Palmer Archipelago. The name appears on a chart based upon a British expedition under Henry Foster, 1828–31, who perhaps gave the name for George Cockburn, British naval officer and Admiral of the Fleet in 1851. The cape was charted by the French Antarctic Expedition, 1903–05, under Jean-Baptiste Charcot. The cape was photographed from the air by Falkland Islands and Dependencies Aerial Survey Expedition in 1956–57.

Further reading 
 United States. Defense Mapping Agency. Hydrographic Center, Sailing Directions for Antarctica: Includes Islands South of Latitude 60.̊, P 338
 Defense Mapping Agency  1992, Sailing Directions (planning Guide) and (enroute) for Antarctica, P 277
 Management Plan for Antarctic Specially Protected Area No. 153 EASTERN DALLMANN BAY, Measure 10 (2015)

External links 

 Cape Cockburn on USGS website
 Cape Cockburn on SCAR website

References 
 

Headlands of the Palmer Archipelago